Hombres de esta tierra is a 1922 Chilean silent film, the debut film of Carlos F. Borcosque. It features boxer Luis Vicentini, Jorge Infante, Ketty Zambelli, and Alfredo Rondanelli.

Cast
Luis Vicentini 		
Jorge Infante 		
Ketty Zambelli 			
Alfredo Rondanelli 		
Eugenio Matte Hurtado 		
César Olivos Prado 			
Fernando Corres

References

External links
 

1922 films
Chilean silent films
Films directed by Carlos F. Borcosque
Chilean black-and-white films